Greuceanu is a hero of the Romanian folklore. It is a brave young man who finds that the Sun and the Moon have been stolen by zmei. After a long fight with the three zmei and their wives (zmeoaice), Greuceanu sets the Sun and the Moon free so the people on Earth have light again.

"Greuceanu" is also the title of a fairy tale collected by Petre Ispirescu in Legende sau basmele românilor.

Summary
In the kingdom of the Red Emperor ("împăratului Roșu"), an ogre has stolen the sun and the moon from the sky, and the Red Emperor promises to give his daughter's hand in marriage and half of his kingdom to anyone brave enough to get them back. A youth named Greuceanu decides to take up on the offer. On his way to the castle, he meets two deserters who are to be beheaded on the king's orders, but Greuceanu thinks he may dissuade the king of his decision and offer them a pardon. The emperor agrees.

Greuceanu takes his brother and visits Faur, the "world's greatest smith" and his sworn brother ("Faurul pământului", in the original). Greuceanu and Faur work together to fashion an iron replica of him. Afterwards, Greuceanu and his brother go to a crossroads and each depart, giving each other a token of life (a kerchief) to signal that one has perished.

Greuceanu reaches the house of the ogre and his family, and turns himself into a dove, perching in a nearby tree. One of the ogresses sees the dove and considers it a bad omen for them. Greuceanu takes the form of a fly, enters the house and spies on their plans. Armed with this new knowledge, he departs to the bridge to the Green Forest, where the ogres will pass, one at evening, another at midnight and the third at dawn.

Time passes, and the ogres (the ogre father and his two sons-in-law) begin to reach the bridge on their horses, just as they have planned. However, each of the ogres' horses alert its rider of Greuceanu's presence. The hero appears and wrestles the three ogres. The last one, the father-ogre, is the fiercest of them all, which Greuceanu has trouble defeating at first. A raven flies over the battle, to whom Greuceanu bids bring him some water to drink, and the raven will gain three ogre corpses to devour.

Greuceanu wins and restores the sun and the moon. He returns to the crossroads and meets his brother. They embrace and go home. On the way, they notice a pear tree, and a cold spring of fresh water near a garden. Greuceanu stops his brother from picking up any pear and drinking the water, for they are the ogre's two daughters, disguised as natural things. The hero strikes the pear tree and the stem of a flower in the garden, killing the two ogresses.

Now back on the road, Greuceanu and his brother look behind them and see the mother ogress coming at them like a cloud of smoke. The duo reaches Faur's workshop to put their plan in action: the ogress demands to talk with Greuceanu. Faur and the hero give her the iron likeness to devour, filled with hot coals. The ogress bursts and dies. The trio celebrate their victory.

Greuceanu rides alone to the Red Emperor's kingdom to gain his reward, and meets a lame devil on the road. The lame devil steals Greuceanu's sword, a scimitar (the source of the hero's power), and delivers it to the Emperor's councillor, who has struck a bargain with the devil to take the credit for Greuceanu's job and marry the princess.

Analysis

Classification
The tale of Greuceanu can be classified in the Aarne-Thompson-Uther Index as tale type 328A*, "Three Brothers Steal Back the Sun, Moon and Star". The tale also contains type 300A, "Fight on the Bridge", wherein the hero fights three dragons on bridges. Romanian scholarship also classifies the tale as types ATU 300A and 328A*, with the last episode falling under type ATU 302B, "(Hero with) Life Dependent on a Sword".

The narrative
Hungarian scholar Ágnes Kóvacs recognized some mythical components in the story: the theft of the celestial bodies; the confrontation between heroes and the serpents (dragons, etc.); the revenge of the dragons' wives; the presence of the "World Blacksmith" as the final helper.

According to scholar Linda Dégh, the hero in Hungarian variants can be characterized as a táltos, someone imbued with great power and knowledge, and the blacksmith figure is sometimes described as a smith of God or smith of the world.

Parallels
Similar stories about the theft of celestial bodies and their recovery by a human hero are attested in nearby regions. According to Hungarian scholarship (namely, János Berze Nagy and Ágnes Kovács), versions are attested in Romania, Serbia, the Czech Republic, Slovakia, Russia, Lithuania, Estonia, as well as some Asian/Siberian variants.

Ágnes Kovács also named this type Szépmezőszárnya ("Beautiful Wing-Field"), with similar tales in Romanian, Czech, Slovak, Ruthenia, Russia, Vogul, Chuvash, Tatar, Lithuanian, Latvian, Estonian, Caucasian and South Siberian. German scholar Kurt Ranke is reported to have collected one from East Prussia and another from Schleswig-Holstein.

Hungarian-American scholar Linda Dégh also reported that "parallels" were found in Romania, and stories with its "elements" were located among "the Russians, the Ural-Altaic Turks, and to [the Hungarians'] kindred nations of North Asia".

Russian folklorist  claimed that East Slavic tale type 300A, "Battle on the Bridge" (see below), is "frequent" in East Slavic tales, but located variants in the Czech Republic, Slovakia and Livonia.

Romania
Romanian historian Andrei Oișteanu terms this narrative Furarea astrelor or Stealing of the Stars.

In tales
In another Romanian variant, Aripă-Frumoasă ("Wing-Beautiful"), three brothers are born on the same day, one in the evening (thus named Evening); another at midnight (thus named Midnight), and lastly the third in the morning (being called Break-of-Day). In this story, their mother reveals to them the king's quest to reclaim the sun, the moon and the star from the hands of the ogres. As they go on their quest, they meet an ogre on a copper horse on the copper bridge; another on a silver horse on the silver bridge, and the third on a gold horse on the golden bridge.

In a tale from Bukovina, the three heroes, named Mintă-Creață, Busuioc and Sucnă-Murgă, find the day star and Saint Peter's Keys to the Kingdom of Heaven, after defeating the villains.

Other Romanian variants are Drăgan-Cenușă and Cu Odolean – 
fičioru Boldicuțî.

In colinde
Scholarship locates a very similar tale to Greuceanu in Romanian colinde (Christmas carols). In some of them, Judas is the one to steal the stars, the sun and the moon from the skies, and Saint John, Saint Elijah and Saint Peter are the ones to restore them.<ref>Ciubotaru, Silvia. "Elemente de mitologie solară în colindele române" (Eléments de mythologie solaire dans les chansons de Noël). In: Anuarul Muzeului Etnografic al Moldovei [The Yearly Review of the Ethnographic Museum of Moldavia]. 2/2002. p. 52.</ref>

Moldova
In a Moldavian tale published by author Grigore Botezatu with the title Dragan-The-Bold, an old woman has three sons who grow up in days and develop the ability to fly. In the same kingdom, a dark cloud appears one day, and three dragons from the netherworld kidnap the king's three daughters and steal the sun, the moon and the stars, casting the kingdom in darkness. Dragan, the youngest, and his elder brothers take on the task. For three years, they venture in the world until they reach the center of the earth, where there is a hole that leads to the netherworld. Dragan goes down the hole and, transforms into a bee to spy on a witch named Scorpion, mother of the dragons, and their wives. The wives talk about their husbands passing by a copper bridge, a silver bridge, and a golden bridge. Dragan-The-Bold kills each of the dragons in each of the bridges, and pockets the luminaries. After learning of the death of her sons, the witch Scorpion goes after Dragan to eat him. Dragan, however, remembers that his mother had a brother (his uncle) named Kozma Dimir, who lives in the netherworld and works as a blacksmith. After killing her with his uncle's help, Dragan finds the princesses and guides them to a rope that leads to the upper world. Dragan's brothers betray him and cut off the rope, stranding him in the nether world. Dragan returns to Kozma Dimir's smithy and asks him how he can get back to the surface. His uncle tells him to go to grandfather Valerian's orchard and climb the Apple-tree of life in his orchard.

Hungary
In Hungary, the tale type is known as type AaTh 328A*, Freeing a heavenly body or Az Égitestszabadító ("The Celestial Saviour"): the dragons capture the celestial lights,; the hero and his companions seek the help of the smith of the world or the Earth.

This narrative was previously classified by Hungarian scholar János Berze Nágy in his own classification system as BN 319*, which, in the international index of Aarne-Thompson-Uther, corresponded to types 328A* and 300A. According to scholarship, Berze Nagy registered 30 Hungarian variants of type 319*.

 Regional tales 
In a Hungarian tale collected by Lájos Kálmány with the title Nap, Hold, Csillag kiszabadítása, the Sun, the Moon and the Star are being guarded by three multi-headed Sarkans (dragon-like creatures). Three brothers rise to take them back.

In a tale collected by Arnold Ipolyi with the title A tátos, the king laments that he must surrender his daughter to a twelve-headed dragon, else it will devour the sun. His three sons decide to stop their sister's sacrifice and march to deal with the dragon, but fail and the sun is taken by the dragon. As usual, the youngest son is the successful one, with the help of a horse with extraordinary abilities.

A related tale titled Zöldmezőszárnya ("Wings of the Green Field"; "Green Meadow's Wings") was collected from teller János Puji, in Marosszentkirály (Sâncraiu de Mureș) by ethnographer Olga Nagy (hu) and published in 1978. In this story, a king is prophesied to lose his three daughters when they are 18 years old. It so happens, and the sun, the moon and the stars also disappear in the same day. Elsewhere in the kingdom, three sons are born to a poor woodcutter in the same day, one during the night, the second at midnight, and the third at dawn. They each grow up in hours, take their horses and reach three bridges. On one they fight a 12-headed dragon, on a golden bridge a 24-headed one, and on the diamond bridge a 32-headed dragon. After rescuing the luminaries, their mission is to find the lost princesses. They go to the "Világkovács" ('The World Blacksmith') and have to contend with the mother of the three dragons.

In the tale Kiss Miklos, and the Green Daughter of the Green King, translated by Jeremiah Curtin, a father, on his deathbed, tells his three sons their kingdom is cast in darkness because the Sun and the Moon have been stolen, and that one of the three is destined to get them back. The three brothers begin their quest. Kiss Miklos takes a lame horse and waits by the silver bridge for the coming of the twelve-headed dragon riding the milk-white, black-maned steed of the moon. He defeats the dragon and moves to the golden bridge, where he springs a trap on the 24-headed dragon riding on the steed of the sun. The battle between both evolves to a magical duel where one becomes a blue flame and the other a red flame. Kiss Miklos kills the second dragon and takes the sun. Some time later, he arrives at a cabin where the dragons' wives and mother are discussing their plans. Later, after killing the wives, Kiss Miklos arrives at the abode of Lead Friend (or Lead-Melting Friend), buys a great quantity of molten lead and both pour it down on the witch mother's mouth, killing her. The tale segues into another tale type, ATU 513A, "How Six Made Their Way Into the World", where Kiss Miklos and another group of superpowered individuals work together to gain a princess.

East Slavic languages
According to Russian scholarship, similar stories are attested in the East Slavic tale corpus, under the classification 300A*, "Возвращение змееборцем похищенных змеем небесных светил" ("Returning the celestial lights stolen by a serpent"). Russian scholar , who updated this classification index in 1979, noted that the story of the recovery of the celestial lights led into East Slavic type 300A, "Fight on Kalinov Bridge", whose last episode is the killing of the witch with the aid of the smith. According to Russian scholarship and folklorists, this  appears in East Slavic folklore as a liminal space, since the bridge crosses over a swamp or a fiery river named , and upon it the hero does battle with the wicked villain (e. g., Chudo-Yudo, Zmei Gorynych).Русаков В.М. (2019). Врата. In: Дискурс-Пи, 16 (1 (34)), 112-113. URL: https://cyberleninka.ru/article/n/vrata (дата обращения: 13.01.2022).

The name "Kalinov" has been variously interpreted to mean "blazing", "incandescent", in regards to it being made of iron; or "a type of tree or flower", such as the guelder-rose tree (Viburnum).

According to professor Jack V. Haney, stories about a fight between the hero and a villain on a bridge are "common" in East Slavic. In another work, Haney translated the term as "Kalin Bridge" and suggested that its appearance in the oral repertoire of other peoples is due to East Slavic influence.

Russia
In a South Russian tale translated by William Ralston Shedden-Ralston as Ivan Popyalof, the titular hero, who lay in the ashes of the stove for 12 years, decides to battle a villainous zmey (called 'Snake', in the story) to rescue the sun for the day to return to his land. Ivan and two companions defeat the zmey, but the Snake's daughters and wife try to enact their revenge on the heroes. At last, the Snake's Wife pursues Ivan Popyalof to the forge of Kuzma and Demian. Haney argues for a certain antiquity in this tale, since it mentions the pair of smiths Kuzma and Demian.

Belarus
According to professor Andreas Johns, in one version from Belarus, the sun, the moon and the stars are stolen by sorcerer Koschei. The hero, then, has to contend with Koschei's sons, daughters and serpent wife.

Slovakia
Author Josef Wenzig translated into German a Slovak tale he titled Das Sonnenroß or The Sun Horse. In this tale, in a darkened land, the only source of light is a horse with a sun-shaped mark on its forehead that belongs to the king and shines its light on its daily voyage. However, the horse has disappeared, stolen by three enemy kings. The king knocks on the door of an old seer and begs him to take back the sun horse. The Seer leaves with a young companion. He turns into a little bird and visits the wives of each enemy king. In this shape, he overhears each queen lament over her husband's absence, but an old woman named Striga, mother of all three queens, enters her daughter's chambers abruptly demanding the queen kills the little bird. The Seer flies away and returns to his companion, knowing the location of the three kings. So he travels to a bridge and lies in waiting. The first two kings pass by the bridge and are killed by the Seer. When the youngest king passes by the bridge with the Sun Horse, he notices something amiss and challenges the Seer to a duel. The Seer and the king change into "waggon-wheels" and different coloured flames and face each other in a magical duel. An old man passes by the event and the Seer, in the shape of a flame, begs the old man to bring some water to put out the other flame. The old man does and the youngest enemy king dies. Sensing their sons-in-law have been defeated, the Striga takes her three daughters and fly away to enact her revenge. Meanwhile, the Seer has found the Sun Horse and makes his way back with his companion. On the way, the companion sees a fruit-bearing tree, a stream and a garden of flowers, but the Seer knows they are disguises for the Striga's three daughters, and strikes each one, drawing a pool of blood. The tale continues as type AaTh 468, "The Tree that Reached up to the Sky" and ATU 302, "The Ogre's Heart in an Egg". The tale was originally published by Ján Francisci-Rimavský with the title Slncoví kuon and sourced as Hungarian-Slovenish by Albert Wratislaw.

Georgia
Georgian scholarship also registers variants of type ATU 300A in Georgia. In these tales, the hero defeats the ogres on a bridge, then kills the wives of the ogres, and at last kills his final foe with the help of the smiths.

Chuvash people
In a tale from the Chuvash people translated into Hungarian as Hogyan mentették meg a vitézek a napot meg a holdat ("How the Knights rescued the Sun and Moon"), a Great Dragon steals the Sun and the Moon, casting the world in darkness. Three knights are born in the meantime, named Earth-Knight, Oak-Knight and Mountain-Knight. They join forces to fight the Great Dragon and his sons and restore the luminaries.

Mordvin people
In a tale from the Mordvin people titled "Ивашка Приметлев" ("Ivashka Primetlev"), in a kingdom, something steals the Sun, the moon and the stars, casting the realm in darkness. The king gathers the people and offers half of his kingdom as prize to anyone that can bring them back. A youth named Ivashka Primetlev offers to go. He is joined by a companion. They stop by a bridge. While his companion is asleep, Ivashka waits by the bridge for the coming of the five-headed Pryamaryalya. They engage in combat and the youth kills his many-headed foe. He continues his quest by going to another bridge and fighting a seven-headed Pryamaryalya, and a third bridge, where he fights a nine-headed Pryamaryalya. Later, Ivashka spies on the mother and the wives of the three many-headed foes, and learns them will avenge their fallen relatives: each of the wives will become a fountain, an apple tree and a storm to deceive Ivashka and his companion. However, Ivashka, wary of the deceit, kills the fountain and the apple tree. As for the third wife, the storm chases after Ivashka and his companion, until they find a forge on the road. With the help of the smith, Ivashka kills the third wife. Later, Ivashka gathera group of skilled individuals to find the daughter of Baba Buryaga.

Baltic languages
Lithuanian ethnologist Nijole Laurinkiene noted that in similar tales from Baltic mythology (mainly, Latvian and Lithuanian), the Sun and the Moon are stolen by Velns (Velnias), a creature that represents the underworld, while their liberator wields a hammer.

Lithuania
According to professor Jūratė Šlekonytė, Lithuania registers 51 variants of type ATU 300A, collected "mostly in central and northern" parts of the country.

Latvia
In the Latvian Folktale Catalogue, tale type ATU 300A* is titled Puisis iegūst ķēniņa meitu ("The Man gets the King's Daughter"). Its second redaction, titled Pazudusī saule ("The Stolen Sun"), pertains to the rescue of the luminaries by the hero.

Finnic languages
Nijole Laurinkiene noted that in the Finnish Kalevala and the Karelian legends, the luminaries are stolen by a being related to darkness and death, like Louhi, ruler of the northernmost land of Pohjola. The liberator of the luminaries, however, is a character related to smithing: the smith himself or his daughter (in the oldest versions, Laurinkiene supposes), or the Son of God, in more Christianized tales.

Karelia
In a Karelian tale, "Ольховая Чурка" ("The Block of Alder Wood"), an old man carves a son out of wood to fulfill his wife's wishes to rock a baby in a cradle. After three years, the wooden figure is given life and calls the old couple his parents. Due to his great strength, he leaves home and meets two other companions. The trio reaches a kingdom where the sun has been stolen by a nine-headed serpent, the moon by a six-headed serpent, and the dawn by a three-headed serpent. After the heroes kill the serpents and rescue the celestial bodies, the serpents' mother, the witch Syöjätär, plans her revenge on the heroes. A nearly identical story was translated by Parker Fillmore as Log: The Story of the Hero Who Released the Sun, and sourced from Finland.

Ethnologist Nijole Laurinkiene (lt) reported another Karelian version of the theft and release of the celestial bodies. In this version, in an "hymn about the Sun's liberation", the world has been cast in darkness, and the Son of God (or the smith's daughter, in another version), journeys to Hiitola, "the land of devils", to free the Sun and the Moon.

Finland
In a Finnish tale translated as Leppä Polkky and the Blue Cross, an old man named Jukka and his wife long to have a child, so they bring home an alder stump and place it the cradle to rock it. For three years, they rock the alder stump as if a son, until one day a wizard turns the alder stump into a boy while both man and woman are away from the cradle. The boy grows up and is named  ("Alder Stump"), and becomes incredibly strong. One day, all of a sudden, a thick darkness falls over the world. A Lapland wizard explains to the king that a witch named Loviatar and her three serpent sons stole the Sun ("Aurinko"), the Moon ("Kuu") and the Dawn ("Päivänkoitto"). Leppä Polkky finds two other companions and they depart on a journey. They meet a wise old woman named Leski-Akka, who reveals that the three serpent sons not only stole the celestial light, but are threatening the country unless the king surrenders each of his daughters as sacrifice for the serpents. Leppä Polkky and his allies kill the serpent sons and restore the lumnaries. The trio journey back to their kingdom, but Leppä Polkky sees a hut in the middle of the forest and takes a look inside: it is Loviatar, conspiring with fellow witches her terrible revenge. Loviatar will send them hunger and place a table with food before them, then thirst and create a pool of drinkable water, and lastly sleep and place beds in front of them, and casts a curse that, if anyone reveals her plans, they shall become a blue cross. Leppä Polkky and his allies defeat Loviatar's new plot. Leppä Polkky goes after Loviatar, but she orders him to bring Katrina of Kiijoki, the most beautiful princess in the world. With the help of new companions with strange and extraordinary powers (tale type ATU 513, "The Wonderful Companions"), Leppä Polkky brings Katrina of Kiijoki.

Estonia
Although the story seems to lack the first part (rescue of the celestial bodies), Estonian variants of type 300A, "Võitlus sillal", still follow the three heroes and the battle on the bridge against the "Evil One". As a continuation, the heroic trio descends into Hell, where the wives of the evil spirits conspire against them. The tales still ends with the blacksmith feeding the witch hot coals to kill her.

See also
 Kalevala
 "The Widow's Son" (be) (Belarusian fairy tale)
 Storm-Bogatyr, Ivan the Cow's Son

References

Further reading
 Л. Г. Бараг [Barag, Lev]. "Сюжет о змееборстве на мосту в сказках восточнославянских и других народов" [About the tale of the battle against a snake on a bridge in tales from the East Slavs and other peoples]. In: "Славянский и балканский фольклор: Обряд" [Slavic and Balkanic Folklore: Rites]. Текст / Отв. ред. Н. И. Толстой. М.: «Наука», 1981. pp. 160–188. (In Russian)
 Rykowski, Rafał. "Motivul luptei eroului cu zmeii pe pod în basmele fantastice românești" [The Motif of the Bridge Fight of the Hero with the Dragons in the Romanian Fantastic Tales]. In: Annales Universitatis Apulensis. Series Philologica. 1, 12/2011, pp. 231–240.
 Rykowski, Rafał. "MOTIVUL FURTULUI AȘTRILOR ÎN BASMELE ROMÂNEȘTI șI CELE ALE POPOARELOR VECINE" [The motif of astral theft in the Romanian fairy-tales and those of the neighbouring people]. In: Annales Universitatis Apulensis. Series Philologica''. 1, 13/2012, pp. 329–354.

Romanian mythology
Romanian fairy tales
ATU 300-399